Enfield Chase railway station is located in Windmill Hill, Enfield, in the London Borough of Enfield, north London,  from  on the Hertford Loop Line. It is in Travelcard Zone 5.

History

The original terminus

The original Enfield Station in Windmill Hill opened on 1 April 1871 as the terminus for the Great Northern Railway branch line from Alexandra Palace. By 1887, 37 trains a day left Enfield, mainly for King's Cross, but also to Broad Street and until 1907, to Woolwich and Victoria. The station building was a two-storey twin-gabled house, similar in style to the single-storey building at Palmers Green. It was sited lengthways across the end of the track. The single island platform was covered by a wide canopy for much of its length. Enfield Station had been intended to bring prosperous middle-class commuters to the area. A journalist visiting the station in 1885, saw a sign advertising cheap workmen's tickets for trains scheduled to arrive in London before 8 am, only to find that the timetable showed that there were no trains that met that criterion. The old Enfield Station closed to passengers in 1910 and was replaced by the present station, but remained in use as a goods depot until 1974. The surviving buildings were demolished and replaced in the 2000s with housing along a new street, Gladbeck Way.

The new high level station

By the end of the 19th century, there was a need to relieve the pressure on the main line to the north out of Kings Cross, and a plan to continue the Enfield branch to Hertford and Stevenage was conceived. An Act of Parliament was passed in 1898, and the GNR set about acquiring and demolishing houses and compensating land owners in the area. Work on the line commenced in 1906. The new Enfield Station was sited a few hundred yards to the east of the existing one, and raised above ground level so that north bound trains could access a new bridge crossing the road at Windmill Hill. It opened on 4 April 1910 for services as far as Cuffley. The first through train to Stevenage did not run until 4 March 1918, because of a host of legal and engineering difficulties, and shortages of men and material caused by World War I. The name Enfield Chase was adopted in 1924, to avoid confusion with Enfield Town station.

Services
All services at Enfield Chase are operated by Great Northern using  EMUs.

The typical off-peak service in trains per hour is:
 2 tph to 
 2 tph to  via 

Connections
London Buses routes 121, 231, 307, 313, 377 and 456 serve the station.

See also
 Enfield Lock railway station
 Enfield Town railway station

References

External links

 

Enfield, London
Railway stations in the London Borough of Enfield
Former Great Northern Railway stations
Railway stations in Great Britain opened in 1910
1910 establishments in England
Enfield Chase
Railway stations served by Govia Thameslink Railway